Teo Redding (born December 8, 1994) is an American football wide receiver for the Houston Gamblers of the United States Football League (USFL). He attended Michigan Collegiate High School. He played college football at Bowling Green and was originally signed by the Detroit Lions as an undrafted free agent in 2018. He has also been a member of the Washington Redskins, Green Bay Packers, New York Guardians, and Montreal Alouettes.

Professional career

Detroit Lions
Redding signed with the Detroit Lions as an undrafted free agent on May 11, 2018. He was waived on August 31, 2018.

Washington Redskins
On September 11, 2018, Redding signed with the Washington Redskins' practice squad, but was waived on September 18.

Green Bay Packers
On November 20, 2018, Redding was signed to the Green Bay Packers practice squad. He signed a reserve/future contract with the Packers on December 31, 2018. He was released on August 31, 2019.

New York Guardians
Redding was signed by the New York Guardians of the XFL on December 23, 2019. He had his contract terminated when the league suspended operations on April 10, 2020.

Montreal Alouettes
Redding signed with the Montreal Alouettes of the CFL on December 18, 2020.

Houston Gamblers
On March 10, 2022, Redding was drafted by the Houston Gamblers of the United States Football League in the 2022 USFL Supplemental Draft. He was transferred to the team's practice squad before the start of the regular season on April 16, 2022, and remained on the inactive roster on April 22. He was transferred to the active roster on April 30. He was ruled inactive for the team's game against the New Orleans Breakers on May 8, 2022, and moved back to the active roster on May 14.

References

External links
Bowling Green Falcons bio

1994 births
Living people
Players of American football from Michigan
Sportspeople from Warren, Michigan
American football wide receivers
Bowling Green Falcons football players
Detroit Lions players
Washington Redskins players
Green Bay Packers players
New York Guardians players
Montreal Alouettes players
Houston Gamblers (2022) players